Limestone Canyon virus (LSC) is a single-stranded, negative-sense RNA zoonotic Orthohantavirus that is genetically similar to Sin Nombre orthohantavirus which causes Hantavirus pulmonary syndrome (HPS) in humans. HPS causing hantaviruses are found only in the United States and South America.

LSC has not been shown to cause HPS in humans.

Reservoir
The virus was isolated from the brush mouse (Peromyscus boylii). Phylogenetic analysis of M genome segment showed LSC to be very distinct from other Peromyscus-borne viruses. Other Peromyscus-associated hantaviruses include Sin Nombre orthohantavirus (SNV), New York orthohantavirus (NYV), and Monongahela virus (MGLV).

See also
1993 Four Corners hantavirus outbreak

References

External links
Sloan Science and Film / Short Films / Muerto Canyon by Jen Peel 29 minutes
"Hantaviruses, with emphasis on Four Corners Hantavirus" by Brian Hjelle, M.D., Department of Pathology, School of Medicine, University of New Mexico
 CDC's Hantavirus Technical Information Index page
 Viralzone: Hantavirus
 Virus Pathogen Database and Analysis Resource (ViPR): Bunyaviridae
 Occurrences and deaths in North and South America

Viral diseases
Hantaviridae
Rodent-carried diseases
Infraspecific virus taxa